Sue Costello (born April 2, 1968) is an actress, comedian, writer and producer from the Savin Hill area in the Dorchester neighborhood of Boston, Massachusetts.

Costello starred in the self-titled television series, Costello on Fox, where she was also a producer and the co-creator of the show.

Costello has also appeared on television shows such as NYPD Blue, Tough Crowd with Colin Quinn on Comedy Central and Comics Unleashed. She was a guest host on NBC's Later, and has also performed on Comedy Central's "Premium Blend".

Costello has appeared in the films Southie, Once in the Life and The Fighter.

Costello appeared in NBC's Last Comic Standing in 2004, making it to the finals,  and can be heard on Episodes 172 and 936 of Marc Maron's podcast, WTF.

Costello wrote and stars in her one-woman show, "Minus 32 Million Words"   and launched her own podcast, "The Kadoozie Kast with Sue Costello" in December 2012.

In Watts, California, there is an official Sue Costello day on September 29.

Costello was a frequent guest on the Jay Thomas Show, a radio show on SiriusXM Comedy Greats.

References

Living people
Actresses from Boston
American women comedians
Comedians from Massachusetts
20th-century American comedians
21st-century American comedians
American television actresses
20th-century American actresses
1968 births
21st-century American actresses